Magkaibang Mundo is a 2016 Philippine television drama fantasy romance series broadcast by GMA Network. It premiered on the network's Afternoon Prime line up and worldwide on GMA Pinoy TV from May 23, 2016 to September 16, 2016, replacing Wish I May.

Mega Manila and Urban Luzon ratings are provided by AGB Nielsen Philippines.

Series overview

Episodes

May 2016

June 2016

July 2016

August 2016

September 2016

Notelist

References

Lists of Philippine drama television series episodes